Valley Cougars are a rugby league team based in Treharris. They play in the Wales Premier League, which they won in 2017 after defeating the Torfaen Tigers in the league's Grand Final.

History
They were founded in 2001 as Cynon Valley Cougars and joined the Welsh Division of the Rugby League Conference in 2003. After their debut season in the Welsh Division they dropped Cynon from their name They led a nomadic existence for their first few years in the valleys playing out of places like Pontyclun, Abercynon and Sardis Road, Pontypridd, Nelson and Treharris . They won the Welsh Premier in 2008 and 2010.
In 2011, they were promoted to the Rugby League Conference National Division. In 2014 they moved to the Conference League South and after finishing runners up in the league they went on to beat Sheffield Hallam Eagles in the grand final in their debut season. 2015 saw them claim top spot in the league but they lost the grand final to Nottingham Outlaws

Club honours
 RLC Welsh Premier champions: 2003, 2008, 2010, 2017
 Conference League South champions: 2014

References

External links
 Official Wales Rugby League Website

Rugby League Conference teams
Rugby league in Wales
Welsh rugby league teams
Rugby clubs established in 2001
2001 establishments in Wales